Athletics competitions at the 1985 South Pacific Mini Games were held at the Tereora National Stadium in Rarotonga, Cook Islands, between August 1–9, 1985.

A total of 40 events were contested, 23 by men and 17 by women.

Medal summary
Medal winners and their results were published on the Athletics Weekly webpage
courtesy of Tony Isaacs and Børre Lilloe, and on the Oceania Athletics Association webpage by Bob Snow.

Complete results can also be found on the Oceania Athletics Association, and on the Athletics PNG webpages.

Men

Women

Medal table (unofficial)

Participation (unofficial)
Athletes from the following 12 countries were reported to participate:

 
 
 
/
 
 
 
 
 
 
/

References

External links
Pacific Games Council
Oceania Athletics Association

Athletics at the Pacific Mini Games
Athletics in the Cook Islands
South Pacific Mini Games
1985 in the Cook Islands
1985 Pacific Games